The 2018 California Insurance Commissioner election was held on November 6, 2018, to elect the Insurance Commissioner of California.  Under California's nonpartisan blanket primary law, all candidates appear on the same ballot, regardless of party. In the primary, voters may vote for any candidate, regardless of their party affiliation. The top two finishers — regardless of party — advance to the general election in November, even if a candidate manages to receive a majority of the votes cast in the primary election.

Incumbent Democratic Commissioner Dave Jones was term-limited and could not seek re-election to a third term.

Primary election

Democratic Party

Declared
 Ricardo Lara, state senator
 Asif Mahmood, pulmonologist

Declined
 Susan Bonilla, former state assemblywoman
 Tony Mendoza, state senator

No party preference

Declared
Steve Poizner, former Republican California Insurance Commissioner (2007–2011)

Peace and Freedom Party

Declared
 Nathalie Hrizi, teacher and 2014 candidate for Insurance Commissioner

Endorsements

Polling

Results

Results by county

Primary results by county. Gray represents counties won by Poizner. Blue represents counties won by Lara.

General election

Endorsements

Polling

Results

References

External links
Official campaign websites
 Ricardo Lara (D) for Insurance Commissioner
 Steve Poizner (NPP) for Insurance Commissioner

Insurance Commissioner
California Insurance Commissioner elections
California